Odostomia sillana is a species of sea snail, a marine gastropod mollusc in the family Pyramidellidae, the pyrams and their allies.

Description
The short, yellowish white shell has a conic shape. (The whorls of the protoconch of the type specimen are eroded). Its length measures 5.6 mm. The 5½  whorls of the teleoconch are well rounded, slightly overhanging. The summits of the whorls are appressed. The whorls are  marked by almost vertical lines of growth and numerous closely spaced, wavy, microscopic, spiral striations. The suture is well marked. The periphery of the body whorl is well rounded. The inflated base of the shell is rather short, narrowly umbilicated and marked like the spire. The aperture is broadly ovate, somewhat effuse anteriorly. The posterior angle is acute. The outer lip is thin, and strongly curved in the middle. The columella is slender, strongly curved and reflected anteriorly. It is provided with a weak fold near its insertion. The parietal wall is glazed by a thin callus.

Distribution
This marine species occurs off Amaknak Island, Alaska.

References

External links
 To World Register of Marine Species
 To ITIS

sillana
Gastropods described in 1909